Markku Syrjälä (born 12 May 1955) is a Finnish archer. He competed in the men's individual event at the 1984 Summer Olympics.

References

External links
 

1955 births
Living people
Finnish male archers
Olympic archers of Finland
Archers at the 1984 Summer Olympics
People from Kurikka
Sportspeople from South Ostrobothnia